The Melancholy of Haruhi Suzumiya is an anime television series produced by Kyoto Animation and directed by Tatsuya Ishihara, based on the Haruhi Suzumiya series of light novels written by Nagaru Tanigawa and illustrated by Noizi Ito. The series follows a high school boy known only as Kyon who encounters Haruhi Suzumiya, an erratic girl who is unaware that she possesses unconscious abilities that can alter the very universe, and gets dragged into joining her SOS Brigade, also consisting of an alien, a time traveler, and an esper.

The first season, consisting of 14 episodes, aired in Japan between April 2 and July 2, 2006, presented in a nonlinear order in its original broadcast. The second season, consisting of 14 new episodes, was aired in chronological order between re-airings of the first season's episodes, with all 28 episodes aired between April 3 and October 9, 2009. The series was released in North America by Bandai Entertainment, and was relicensed by Funimation.

The television series was followed by an animated film, The Disappearance of Haruhi Suzumiya, released on February 6, 2010.

Episode list

Season 1
In the original 2006 broadcast of the first season, which aired in Japan between April 2 and July 2, 2006, the episodes were aired in a nonlinear order, with the six episodes making up the first novel's storyline intermixed with episodes based on chapters from various points in the light novels. In the next episode previews, two different numbers for the following episode are given: one number from Haruhi, who numbers the episodes according to where they fit chronologically in the plot, and one number from Kyon, who numbers the episodes in the order in which they aired. The sole exception is episode twelve, which is both the twelfth episode aired and the twelfth episode chronologically, a fact Kyon mentions in the preview. For the DVD releases, "The Adventures of Mikuru Asahina Episode 00" is used as the first episode, but otherwise the episodes follow the chronological order. In the 2009 re-airing, the series was aired in full chronological order, with episodes from the second season mixed in with the first season's episodes based on their chronology. In this airing, the first season's episodes were taken from the DVD editions, featuring visual edits and dialogue changes not featured in the original broadcast.

Note: A = TV broadcast order ("Kyon order"), B = Season one chronological order ("Haruhi order"), C = Season 1 DVD episode order, D = 2009 broadcast order (chronological for both seasons). Click the arrows next to the column headers to change the ordering of the list.

Season 2
The second season was aired in Japan as part of a re-airing of the whole series, with the new episodes mixed in with the first season's episodes based on their chronology. The re-airing aired between April 3 and October 9, 2009, with the second-season episodes appearing between May 22 and September 11, 2009. In DVD releases, the new episodes are collectively referred to as the second season. The English-dubbed version of the second-season episodes of the anime was aired on Animax Asia and its subsidiaries from April 6, 2011.

Note: D = 2009 broadcast order (chronological for both seasons), E = Season 2 DVD episode order

References

Notes

Episodes list
Lists of anime episodes
Lists of science fiction television series episodes